Julius Ruthardt (December 13, 1841 – October 13, 1909) was a German violinist and composer.

Ruthardt was born in Stuttgart to Friedrich Ruthardt, who was an oboist and composer. The younger Ruthardt became a violinist in the Stuttgart court orchestra at a young age in 1855. Later, he worked in a number of cities as Kapellmeister: Riga from 1871 to 1882, Leipzig from 1882, Berlin from 1884, Bremen from 1893, and Berlin again from 1898. He retired to Konstanz in 1900, where he died in 1909. Among his compositions, the incidental music for Bjørnstjerne Bjørnson's Halte-Hulda is notable.

References

German classical violinists
Male classical violinists
German male violinists
German composers
1841 births
1909 deaths
Musicians from Stuttgart
19th-century German musicians
19th-century German male musicians